Helga Guitton (born 18 December 1942) is a German radio and television presenter. She was a disc jockey and interviewer for RTL and was presenter of the 1973 Eurovision Song Contest.

Biography
Guitton worked for RTL from 1964 to 1994. On Radio Luxemburg she co-hosted Tag Schatz, Tag Scherz with Jochen Pützenbacher, who later recalled that they worked so well together, there were rumours they were romantically involved. In 1983 she insisted on co-hosting a memorial programme for a colleague who had died of cancer, to give him moral support, but broke down crying. She hosted the weekday evening programme Viva – die Lust, zu leben, which included quizzes and interviews as well as music.

In the 1990s she worked for RTL plus, now RTL television; in 1988 she was engaged with Rainer Holbe to moderate a sexy interview show, "Kopfkissen-Gespräche bei Prominenten" (Pillow talk with VIPs); she later called these "Liebe ist..." interviews her most successful and enjoyable work, while she called Radio Telex her greatest failure. Her 1985 interview with a combative Klaus Kinski, who ate and drank throughout, only half an hour of which was broadcast, appears on the DVD Kinski Talks I, issued by WDR in 2010.

On 7 April 1973, she was the presenter for the Eurovision Song Contest.

After leaving broadcasting, Guitton became a style and behaviour coach.

See also
List of Eurovision Song Contest presenters

References

External links
TV serials presented by Helga Guitton, at Fernsehserien.de 

1942 births
Living people
Mass media people from Königsberg
German television presenters
German women television presenters
Norddeutscher Rundfunk people
RTL Group people